General elections were held in the Isle of Man between 28 October and 6 November 1924. Independent candidates won a majority of seats in the House of Keys.

Electoral system
The 24 members of the House of Keys were elected from 11 constituencies, which had between one and three seats.

Campaign
A total of 43 candidates contested the elections; 31 independents, 11 from the Manx Labour Party and one from Independent Labour. Despite winning seats in the 1919 elections, neither the National Party nor the Liberal Party nominated candidates.

Results

By constituency

References

general election
1924
Isle of Man
Manx general election
Manx general election